High Wheel may refer to:

Penny-farthing bicycle
High Entrance/Exit Turnstile (HEET)
High wheeler, an early automobile body style